An esoteric programming language (sometimes shortened to esolang) is a programming language designed to test the boundaries of computer programming language design, as a proof of concept, as software art, as a hacking interface to another language (particularly functional programming or procedural programming languages), or as a joke.  The use of the word esoteric distinguishes them from languages that working developers use to write software. The creators of most esolangs do not intend them to be used for mainstream programming, although some esoteric features, such as visuospatial syntax,  have inspired practical applications in the arts. Such languages are often popular among hackers and hobbyists.

Usability is rarely a goal for designers of esoteric programming languages; often their design leads to quite the opposite. Their usual aim is to remove or replace conventional language features while still maintaining a language that is Turing-complete, or even one for which the computational class is unknown.

History
The earliest, and still the canonical example of an esoteric programming language, is INTERCAL, designed in 1972 by Don Woods and James M. Lyon, who said that their intention was to create a programming language unlike any with which they were familiar. It parodied elements of established programming languages of the day such as Fortran, COBOL and assembly language.

For many years, INTERCAL was represented only by paper copies of the INTERCAL manual. Its revival in 1990 as an implementation in C under Unix stimulated a wave of interest in the intentional design of esoteric computer languages.

In 1993, Wouter van Oortmerssen created FALSE, a small stack-oriented programming language with syntax designed to make the code inherently obfuscated, confusing and unreadable. Its compiler is only 1024 bytes in size. This inspired Urban Müller to create an even smaller language, the now-infamous Brainfuck, which consists of only eight recognized characters. Along with Chris Pressey's Befunge (like FALSE, but with a two-dimensional instruction pointer), Brainfuck is now one of the best-supported esoteric programming languages, with canonical examples of minimal Turing tarpits and needlessly obfuscated language features. Brainfuck is related to the P′′ family of Turing machines.

Common features 
While esoteric programming languages differ in many ways, there are some common traits that characterize many languages, such as parody, minimalism, and the goal of making programming difficult. Many esoteric programming languages, such as brainfuck, and similar, use single characters as commands, however, it isn't uncommon for languages to read line by line like conventional programming languages.

Unique data representations 
Conventional imperative programming languages typically allow data to be stored in variables, but esoteric languages may utilize different methods of storing and accessing data. Languages like Brainfuck and Malbolge only permit data to be read through a single pointer, which must be moved to a location of interest before data is read. Others, like Befunge and Shakespeare, utilize one or more stacks to hold data, leading to a manner of execution akin to Reverse Polish notation. Finally, there are languages which explore alternative forms of number representation: the Brainfuck variant Boolfuck only permits operations on single bits, while Malbolge and INTERCAL variant TriINTERCAL replace bits altogether with a base 3 ternary system.

Unique instruction representations 
Esoteric languages also showcase unique ways of representing program instructions. Some languages, such as Befunge and Piet, represent programs in two or more dimensions, with program control moving around in multiple possible directions through the program. This differs from conventional languages in which a program is a set of instructions usually encountered in sequence. Other languages modify instructions to appear in an unusual form, often one that can be read by humans with an alternate meaning to the underlying instructions. Shakespeare achieves this by making all programs resemble Shakespearian plays. Chef achieves the same by having all programs be recipes. Chef is particularly notable in that some have created programs that successfully function both as a program and as a recipe, demonstrating the ability of the language to produce this double meaning.

Difficulty to read and write 
Many esoteric programming languages are designed to produce code that is deeply obfuscated, making it difficult to read and to write. The purpose of this may be to provide an interesting puzzle or challenge for program writers: Malbolge for instance was explicitly designed to be challenging, and so it has features like self-modifying code and highly counterintuitive operations. On the other hand, some esoteric languages become difficult to write due to their other design choices. Brainfuck is committed to the idea of a minimalist instruction set, so even though its instructions are straightforward in principle, the code that arises is difficult for a human to read. INTERCAL's difficulty arises as a result of the choice to avoid operations used in any other programming language, which stems from its origin as a parody of other languages.

Parody and spoof 
One of the aims of esoteric programming languages is to parody or spoof existing languages and trends in the field of programming. For instance, the first esoteric language INTERCAL began as a spoof of languages used in the 1960's, such as APL, Fortran, and COBOL. INTERCAL's rules appear to be the inverse of rules in these other languages. However, the subject of parody is not always another established programming language. Shakespeare can be viewed as spoofing the structure of Shakespearean plays, for instance. The language Ook! is a parody of Brainfuck, where Brainfuck's 8 commands are replaced by various orangutang sounds like "Ook. Ook?"

Examples

Befunge 
Befunge allows the instruction pointer to roam in multiple dimensions through the code. For example, the following program displays "Hello World" by pushing the characters in reverse order onto the stack, then printing the characters in a loop which circulates clockwise through the instructions >, :, v, _,, and ^.
 "dlroW olleH">:v
              ^,_@
There are many versions of Befunge, the most common being Befunge-93.

Binary lambda calculus 
Binary lambda calculus is designed from an algorithmic information theory perspective to allow for the densest possible code with the most minimal means, featuring a 29-byte self interpreter, a 21-byte prime number sieve, and a 112-byte Brainfuck interpreter.

Brainfuck
Brainfuck is designed for extreme minimalism and leads to obfuscated code, with programs containing only eight distinct characters. The following program outputs "Hello, world!":
++++++++++[>+++++++>++++++++++>+++<<<-]>++.>+.+++++++
 ..+++.>++.<<+++++++++++++++.>.+++.------.--------.>+.

Chicken 
Chicken has just three tokens, the word "chicken", " ", and "\n". The compiler interprets the amount of "chickens" on a line as an opcode instruction which it uses to manipulate data on a stack. A simple chicken program can contain dozens of lines with nothing but the word "chicken" repeated countless times. Chicken was invented by Torbjörn Söderstedt who drew his inspiration for the language from a parody of a scientific dissertation.

Chef 
Chef is a stack-oriented programming language created by David Morgan-Mar, designed to make programs look like cooking recipes. Programs consist of a title, a list of variables and their data values, and a list of stack manipulation instructions. A joking design principle states that "program recipes should not only generate valid output, but be easy to prepare and delicious", and Morgan-Mar notes that an example Hello World program with "101 eggs" and "111 cups oil" would produce "a lot of food for one person."

FRACTRAN 
A FRACTRAN program is an ordered list of positive fractions together with an initial positive integer input . FRACTRAN was invented by mathematician John Conway.

GolfScript 
Programs in GolfScript, a language created for code golf, consist of lists of items, each of which is pushed onto the stack as it is encountered, with the exception of variables which have code blocks as their value, in which case the code is executed.

INTERCAL 
INTERCAL, short for "Compiler Language With No Pronounceable Acronym", was created in 1972 as a parody to satirize aspects of the various programming languages at the time.

JSFuck 
JSFuck is an esoteric programming style of JavaScript, where code is written using only six characters: [, ],, !, and +. 
Unlike Brainfuck, which requires its own compiler or interpreter, JSFuck is valid JavaScript code, meaning JSFuck programs can be run in any web browser or engine that interprets JavaScript.

LOLCODE 
LOLCODE is designed to resemble the speech of lolcats. The following is the "Hello World" example:
HAI
CAN HAS STDIO?
VISIBLE "HAI WORLD!"
KTHXBYE

While the semantics of LOLCODE is not unusual, its syntax has been described as a linguistic phenomenon, representing an unusual example of informal speech and internet slang in programming.

Malbolge 
Malbolge (named after the 8th circle of Hell) was designed to be the most difficult and esoteric programming language. Among other features, code is self-modifying by design and the effect of an instruction depends on its address in memory.

Piet 

Piet is a language designed by David Morgan-Mar, whose programs are bitmaps that look like abstract art. The execution is guided by a "pointer" that moves around the image, from one continuous coloured region to the next. Procedures are carried out when the pointer exits a region.

There are 20 colours for which behaviour is specified: 18 "colourful" colours, which are ordered by a 6-step hue cycle and a 3-step brightness cycle; and black and white, which are not ordered. When exiting a "colourful" colour and entering another one, the performed procedure is determined by the number of steps of change in hue and brightness. Black cannot be entered; when the pointer tries to enter a black region, the rules of choosing the next block are changed instead. If all possible rules are tried, the program terminates. Regions outside the borders of the image are also treated as black. White does not perform operations, but allows the pointer to "pass through". The behaviour of colours other than the 20 specified is left to the compiler or interpreter.

Variables are stored in memory as signed integers in a single stack. Most specified procedures deal with operations on that stack, while others deal with input/output and with the rules by which the compilation pointer moves.

Piet was named after the Dutch painter Piet Mondrian. The original intended name, Mondrian, was already taken by an open-source statistical data-visualization system.

Rockstar 

Rockstar is a computer programming language designed for creating programs that are also hair metal power ballads created by Dylan Beattie.

Shakespeare 
Shakespeare is designed to make programs look like Shakespearean plays. For example, the following statement declares a point in the program which can be reached via a GOTO-type statement:

  Act I: Hamlet's insults and flattery.

Unlambda 
Unlambda is a minimalist functional programming language based on SKI calculus, but combined with first-class continuations and imperative I/O (with input usually requiring the use of continuations).

Whitespace 
Whitespace uses only whitespace characters (space, tab, and return), ignoring all other characters, which can therefore be used for comments. This is the reverse of many traditional languages, which do not distinguish between different whitespace characters, treating tab and space the same. It also allows Whitespace programs to be hidden in the source code of programs in languages like C.

Cultural context 
The cultural context of esolangs has been studied by Geoff Cox, who writes that esolangs "shift attention from command and control toward cultural expression and refusal", seeing esolangs as similar to code art and code poetry, such as Mez Breeze's mezangelle.  Daniel Temkin describes Brainfuck as "refusing to ease the boundary between human expression and assembly code and thereby taking us on a ludicrous journey of logic," exposing the inherent conflict between human thinking and computer logic.  He connects programming within an esolang to performing an event score such as those of the Fluxus movement, where playing out the rules of the logic in code makes the point of view of the language clear.

Community 
The esolangs community is a small, but active community. It mostly revolves around the esolangs wiki. On the wiki site, users share, discuss, and document their esolangs, programs, etc. The esolangs wiki community derives from a '#esolangs' channel on various IRC servers, which influenced the creation of the wiki in 2005.

References

Bibliography

External links

 Esolang, the esoteric programming languages wiki
 

Programming language classification
 
Computer humor